François Bouchard may refer to:

 François Bouchard (ice hockey, born 1973), Canadian ice hockey defenceman
 François Bouchard (ice hockey, born 1988), Canadian ice hockey right winger